Enkare Review is a Nairobi-based literary magazine established in August 2016, after initial conversations between Alexis Teyie, Troy Onyango, and Carey Baraka. In its short period of existence, it has published Taiye Selasi, Junot Díaz, Maaza Mengiste, Zukiswa Wanner, Namwali Serpell, Richard Ali, Lidudumalingani, Jericho Brown, Harriet Anena, Beverley Nambozo, Leila Aboulela, Nnedi Okorafor, Stanley Onjezani Kenani, Tendai Huchu, Kọ́lá Túbọ̀sún among others, and interviews with prolific African writer Chuma Nwokolo; and The New Yorker'''s editor, David Remnick.

The magazine publishes fiction, poetry, non-fiction and visual arts from all parts of the globe – with submissions coming from Nigeria, South Africa, Kenya, India, Latin America and the US, but the primary focus is African literature.

History
The magazine's inaugural editorial provided a snapshot of the circumstances in which Enkare Review was founded:

Recent contributors
Some of the recent contributors to the Enkare Review issues include: Romeo Oriogun, Stephen Embleton, Frankline Sunday, Megan Ross,  Wanjala Njalale, Wairimũ Mũrĩithi, Farah Ahamed, Derek Lubangakene, Ebuka Chukwudi Peter, Amatesiro Dore, Frances Ogamba, Kechi Nomu, Michelle Angwenyi, Otiato Guguyu, M.V. Sematlane, Sylvie Taussig, Farai Mudzingwa, Mapule Mohulatsi, and Liam Kruger.

 See also 
List of literary magazines

References

See also

 Transition Magazine Kwani? Saraba Magazine Agbowo''

External links
 

African literature
English-language magazines
Magazines established in 2016
Mass media in Nairobi
Literary magazines